Disco No. 1 (also released as  Sweet Heart) is an arcade video game released in 1982 by Data East. The game was available on DECO Cassette System and conventional versions.

Plot
The player plays as a 90-pound weakling kid in a roller rink who has to skate around the bad guys in order to win the love of cute girls. Earn points by completely encircling one or more tough guys and picking up various bonus items that float across the rink.

Legacy
Disco No. 1 was cloned as Thin Ice for the Intellivision console.

References

1982 video games
Action video games
Arcade video games
Arcade-only video games
Data East video games
Roller skating video games
Video games developed in Japan
Data East arcade games